Vidya Vindu Singh (born 2 July 1945) is an Indian author in Hindi and Awadhi languages. She is best known for her broad work in folk and children's literature. Singh has been awarded Padma Shri in 2022 by the Government of India for her contributions in the field of literature & education.

She has published more than hundred works which include collections of poems, stories and Awadhi folk songs. Moreover, she has also composed more than two dozen folk songs for the festival of Raksha Bandhan in Awadhi and other regional dialects of the region. Apart from her contribution to literature, she is also known for her social work.

Early life and education 
Born in the Jaitpur village of Faizabad district in Uttar Pradesh, Vidya is the daughter of Devanarayan and Pranadevi Singh.

Her initial education was completed from Jalalpur. Thereafter, she completed her M. A. in Hindi literature from Agra University followed by a PhD from Banaras Hindu University.

Bibliography 

 विद्या विन्दु सिंह की 21 कहानियाँ. (2022). (n.p.): Kalpana Prakashan.
 लडडू गोपाल के माई (Laddu Gopal ke Mai): अवधी उपन्यास. (2022). (n.p.): Alina Books.
 फुलवा बरन मन सीता (Phulwa Baran Man Sita): (अवधी कविताएं). (2021). (n.p.): Kalpana Prakashan.
 सड़क पर उगते बच्चे (Sadak Par Ugte Bacche): लघुकथाएँ. (2021). (n.p.): K.K. Publications.
 Awadhi Lokgeet Virasat. (2021). (n.p.): Prabhat Prakashan.
 Uttar Pradesh Ki Lokkathayen. (2021). (n.p.): Prabhat Prakashan.
 Vindu, V. S. (2018). Avadhi Vachik Katha Lok: Abhipray Chintan. India: Prabhat Prakashan Pvt. Limited.
 Siṃha, V. V. (2015). HIRANYAGARBHA. India: Gṛaṇtha Akādamī.
 Siṃha, V. V. (2014). Jangnama. India: Prabhat Prakashan.
 Siṃha, V. V. (2013). Shilantar. India: Grantha Akādamī.
 Siṃha, V. V. (2012). Dholak Rani More Nit Uthi Ayu. India: Jñāna Gaṅgā.
 Siṃha, V. V. (2012). Kāśīvāsa. India: Grantha Akādamī.

Awards 

 2022 - Padma Shri
 2016 - Hindi Gaurav Samman
 Mahadevi Verma Award

References

External links 

 A Talk with Dr. Vidya Vindu Singh on Awadhi literature

Recipients of the Padma Shri in literature & education
20th-century Indian women writers
Women writers from Uttar Pradesh
1945 births
Living people